Karl-Heinz Luck (born 28 January 1945 in Unterschönau, Thüringen) is a former East German nordic combined skier. His best known for winning the bronze medal at the 1972 Winter Olympics in Sapporo in the individual event. He also won the Nordic combined event at the Holmenkollen ski festival in 1970.

Luck also finished 6th in the Nordic combined individual event at the 1970 FIS Nordic World Ski Championships. He retired from international competition in 1973.

External links
 
  – click Vinnere for downloadable pdf file 
 

1945 births
Nordic combined skiers at the 1968 Winter Olympics
Nordic combined skiers at the 1972 Winter Olympics
German male Nordic combined skiers
Holmenkollen Ski Festival winners
Living people
Olympic bronze medalists for East Germany
Olympic medalists in Nordic combined
Medalists at the 1972 Winter Olympics
Sportspeople from Thuringia